An azimuth thruster is a configuration of marine propellers placed in pods that can be rotated to any horizontal angle (azimuth), making a rudder unnecessary.  These give ships better maneuverability than a fixed propeller and rudder system.

Types of azimuth thrusters

There are two major variants, based on the location of the motor:

 Mechanical transmission, which connects a motor inside the ship to the outboard unit by gearing.  The motor may be diesel or diesel-electric.  Depending on the shaft arrangement, mechanical azimuth thrusters are divided into L-drive and Z-drive.  An L-drive thruster has a vertical input shaft and a horizontal output shaft with one right-angle gear.  A Z-drive thruster has a horizontal input shaft, a vertical shaft in the rotating column and a horizontal output shaft, with two right-angle gears.
 Electrical transmission, more commonly called pods, where an electric motor is fitted in the pod itself, connected directly to the propeller without gears. The electricity is produced by an onboard engine, usually diesel or gas turbine. Invented in 1955 by Friedrich W. Pleuger and Friedrich Busmann (Pleuger Unterwasserpumpen GmbH), ABB Group's Azipod was the first product using this technology. 

Mechanical azimuth thrusters can be fixed installed, retractable or underwater-mountable. They may have fixed pitch propellers or controllable pitch propellers. Fixed installed thrusters are used for tugboats, ferries and supply-boats. Retractable thrusters are used as auxiliary propulsion for dynamically positioned vessels and take-home propulsion for military vessels.  Underwater-mountable thrusters are used as dynamic positioning propulsion for very large vessels such as semi-submersible drilling rigs and drillships.

Advantages and disadvantages

Primary advantages are maneuverability, electrical efficiency, better use of ship space, and lower maintenance costs. Ships with azimuth thrusters do not need tugboats to dock, though they may still require tugs to maneuver in difficult places.

The major disadvantage of azimuth drive systems is that a ship with azimuth drive maneuvers differently from one with a standard propeller and rudder configuration, necessitating specialized pilot training. Another disadvantage is they increase the draught of the ship.

The pod-variety, where the electromotor is located outside the hull, puts greater demands on the quality of the seal around the propeller-shaft. This is because any leakages of sea-water will shortcircuit the electromotor. This means that the moving parts will have to fit together especially well with tight clearances, and the remaining seal can be done with for instance oil under positive pressure. The oil will both act as a lubricant as well as a hydrophobic seal.

History
English inventor Francis Ronalds described what he called a “Propelling Rudder” in 1859 that combined the propulsion and steering mechanisms of a boat in a single apparatus.  The propeller was placed in a frame having an outer profile similar to a rudder and attached to a vertical shaft that allowed the device to rotate in plane while spin was transmitted to the propeller.

The modern azimuth thruster using the Z-drive transmission was invented in 1951 by Joseph Becker, the founder of Schottel in Germany, and marketed as the Ruderpropeller.  Becker was awarded the 2004 Elmer A. Sperry Award for the invention. This kind of propulsion was first patented in 1955 by Pleuger.

In the late 1980s, ABB Group developed the Azipod thruster with the motor located in the pod itself.

See also

References

Marine propulsion